The women's tournament was held from 28 July to 5 August 2017.

Laura Ludwig and Kira Walkenhorst won the title, defeating April Ross and Lauren Fendrick in the final, 19–21, 21–13, 15–9. The German pair became the first women's team from Europe to win a gold medal at the World Championships.

Preliminary round

Pool A

|}

|}

Pool B

|}

|}

Pool C

|}

|}

Pool D

|}

|}

Pool E

|}

|}

Pool F

|}

|}

Pool G

|}

|}

Pool H

|}

|}

Pool I

|}

|}

Pool J

|}

|}

Pool K

|}

|}

Pool L

|}

|}

3rd place ranked teams
The four best third-placed teams will advance directly to the round of 32. The other eight third-placed teams will play in the Lucky Losers Playoffs for the additional four spots in the Round of 32.

|}

Lucky losers playoffs

|}

Knockout stage

Bracket

Round of 32

|}

Round of 16

|}

Quarterfinals

|}

Semifinals

|}

Third place match

|}

Final

|}

References

External links
Official website

Women
2017 in women's volleyball